Pratap Gaurav Kendra Rashtriya Tirtha is a tourist spot at Tiger Hill in Udaipur city, Rajasthan state, India. The project, which was started by the Veer Shiromani Maharana Pratap Samiti, aims at providing information about Maharana Pratap and the historical heritage of the area with the help of modern technology.

Background
Pratap Gaurav Kendra Rashtriya Tirth is aimed at providing detailed information about the history and achievements of the king of Mewar Maharana Pratap. The person behind the project is Veteran Sangh Pracharak. To materialise his vision, Veer Shiromani Maharana Pratap Samiti formed in 2002 and a piece of 25 bigha land was purchased in 2007.  The expected budget of this project was 100 crore rupees. The money for the project was also contributed by sangh swayamsewaks.

The RSS General secretary Mohan Bhagwat laid the foundation stone of the attraction in 2008, and inaugurated it in November 2016.

Location
Pratap Gaurav Kendra is located at Tiger Hills in the Bargaon area, near Manoharpura, around 9 km from Udaipur City Railway Station.

Attractions 

There are a number of attractions at Pratap Gaurav Kendra, the main one being the 57 feet high metal statue of Maharana Pratap in a sitting posture. There is also a 12-feet metal statue of Bharat Mata.

The project provides information on the past of Mewar and India, showing how it was plundered by invaders and how its boundaries were reduced. One of the attractions is a presentation of the history of Mewar with moving figures, sound, and light.

There is also information on the history of characters such as Bappa Rawal, Hadi Rani, Panna Dai, and Rana Sangha. Three series of three movies have been produced to show the history of the area and some of the historical figures. In addition, there are galleries with statues and pictures. The Bhakti Dham has nine temples.

Future plans 
 Rajsingh Museum
 Rashtriya Sfoorti Kendra
 Bhamashah Market and Food Court
 Maharana Pratap Water Show

See also
 Moti Magri

References

External links
 
 http://vasundhararaje.in/en/tag/pratap-gaurav-kendra
 http://rajasthanpatrika.patrika.com/story/udaipur/video-pratap-gaurav-kendra-opens-for-public-at-udaipur-2399230.html
 http://hindi.news18.com/tag/pratap-gaurav-kendra/
 http://www.bhaskar.com/news/RAJ-UDA-OMC-MAT-latest-udaipur-news-072003-1551839-NOR.html

Tourist attractions in Udaipur
Monuments and memorials in Rajasthan
Memorials to Maharana Pratap